National Keelung Commercial & Industrial Vocational Senior High School (KLCIVS) is a Taiwanese vocational high school and comprehensive high school located in Qidu, Keelung. Founded in 1949, its initial name was Keelung Municipal Commercial Continuing Education School. After the administration of Taiwan Province Government was streamlined in 2000, the School became national and adopted the current name.

History

1949–1968: Keelung Municipal Commercial Continuing Education School and Keelung Municipal Commercial Vocational Senior High School
Initially named Keelung Municipal Commercial Continuing Education School, the school was first located in modern-day Shin Yi Elementary School, Ren-ai District, Keelung in 1949 as the first commercial school for students in Keelung Area. In 1957, the school was relocated to Liou Ming Chwan Road (also in Ren-ai District) and reorganized into Keelung Municipal Commercial Vocational High School. On April 26, 1960, the school was relocated again to modern-day Zhong-Zeng Park, in which the new school building was built. The day was also concluded as the anniversary day of the school.

1968–2000: Taiwan Provincial Keelung Commercial & industrial Vocational Senior High School
In 1968, it was reorganized into Taiwan Provincial Keelung Commercial & industrial Vocational Senior High School in accordance with the policy by the government. The school was relocated to Qidu where has been the permanent campus of the school. In this year, industrial departments were established.

2000–now: National Keelung Commercial & industrial Vocational Senior High School

Successive principal

Academics 
There are eleven departments in KLCIVS:

Comprehensive Senior High School
Department of Business Management
Department of Accounting
Department of International Trade
Department of Data Processing
Department of Advertisement Design (Department of Advertisement Techniques is included)
Department of Electrics
Department of Computer Science
Department of Avionics
Department of Comprehensive Occupational Abilities
Department of Physical Education

Sister high schools
Hiroshima Prefectural Miyoshi Seiryo Senior High School, Hiroshima Prefecture, Japan

See also
High school
Vocational school
Comprehensive high school
Education in Taiwan
 List of schools in Taiwan

External links

National Keelung Commercial & Industrial Vocational Senior High School 

1949 establishments in Taiwan
High schools in Taiwan
Schools in Keelung